Pilot Talk is the third studio album by rapper Curren$y. It was released under Damon Dash's DD172 record label division, BluRoc Records. The album was originally scheduled to be released on March 23, 2010. However, it was later postponed and then given a June 15, 2010 release. The album was then pushed back and released on July 13. The entire album is solely produced by Ski Beatz except "Prioritize", which is produced by Nesby Phips, and "Roasted", which is produced by Monsta Beatz. Ski Beatz also remixed the song "Breakfast" for the album which was originally produced by Mos Def. Several music videos were shot for the album promotion and can be found on CreativeControl.tv

The album debuted at number 39 on the Billboard 200. It sold just over 10,764 copies its first week. The album is now at 33,000 in total sales.

Promotion
Videos for "Life Under the Scope", "Breakfast", "Address" and "Prioritize" were shot for the album promotion and can be found on CreativeControl.tv. The lead single, "King Kong" was produced by Ski Beatz and released for digital download on April 27, 2010. The music video premiered on DD172's CreativeControl.tv as well as their Vimeo page on May 15, 2010. The video begins with Curren$y driving in his Chevrolet El Camino, playing "Respiration" from the Mos Def & Talib Kweli's Black Star album. Other footage is taken from Curren$y in New Orleans. The video was directed by Jonah Schwartz of Creative Control. The second single, "Roasted", was released for digital download on June 21, 2010 and features Trademark and Young Roddy of Curren$y's Jets International. A music video for the single was released on July 8, 2010. The video was shot in New York at numerous locations including, DD172. A video for the song, Audio Dope II, was released virally on October 12, 2010. The album artwork was created by David Barnett

Track listing

References

2010 albums
Currensy albums
Albums produced by Ski Beatz